A Time in My Life is a 1971 studio album by Sarah Vaughan, arranged by Ernie Wilkins.

Reception

The AllMusic review by Bruce Eder stated that Vaughan "brings an almost chameleon-like presence to this album...which encompasses a decidedly—almost defiantly—contemporary repertory...The accompaniments may almost be too busy for what the songs themselves can bear, but Vaughan always keeps up regardless of the settings and arrangements...On that basis alone, it's a lot more than a mere curio in her output from this period".

Track listing

1991 Mainstream Records CD (MDCD704)

Personnel
Sarah Vaughan – vocals
Albert Vescovo, Joe Pass - guitar
Bob Magnusson - bass
Bill Mays - piano
Earl Palmer - drums
Alan Estes, Jimmy Cobb - percussion
Jackie Kelso, Jerome Richardson, William Green - saxophone
Al Aarons, Buddy Childers, Gene Goe - trumpet
Benny Powell, George Bohanon - trombone
Ernie Wilkins – arranger

References

Mainstream Records albums
Albums arranged by Ernie Wilkins
Albums produced by Bob Shad
Sarah Vaughan albums
1971 albums